Calabrese is an Italian surname, meaning literally "Calabrian" or "from Calabria". Notable people with the surname:

Anthony O. Calabrese, Democratic Party politician in Ohio
Anthony O. Calabrese Jr., son of the above and a judge and Republican Party politician in Ohio
Dan Calabrese, newspaper columnist for North Star Writers Group
Edward Calabrese, American toxicologist
Elizabeth Calabrese, New Jersey Democratic Party politician
Frank Calabrese Sr., Chicago mobster 
Gerald Calabrese, former college and professional basketball player and Democratic politician in New Jersey
Giovanni Calabrese, Italian rower and winner of a bronze medal in the 2000 Olympics
Greg Calabrese, American soap opera actor
John Anthony Calabrese, American classical violist, specialised on the Viola d'Amore, he worked in Europe for several years as "Nane" Calabrese often with I Solisti Veneti
John Calabrese, member of the Canadian band Danko Jones
Karyn Calabrese, American raw foodist and restaurateur
Mike Calabrese, member of the band Lake Street Dive
Salvatore Calabrese, Italian physician

See also
Calabrese (disambiguation)

Italian-language surnames
Italian toponymic surnames
Ethnonymic surnames